Guillermo Franco may refer to:

Guillermo Franco (born 1976), Argentine-Mexican football striker
Guillermo Franco (football defender) (born 1983), Argentine football defender
Guillermo Franco (Ecuadorian general) (born 1811), Ecuadorian historical figure

See also
Guilherme Franco (born 1946), Brazilian jazz percussionist